Peceli Gale (born Nawaka, 27 June 1957) is a Fijian former rugby union footballer. He played as number eight.

Career
His first cap for Fiji was during the match against Tonga, at Suva, on 24 July 1984. Gale was also part of the 1987 Rugby World Cup roster, playing only the match against Argentina, at Hamilton, on 24 May, where he was replaced by Samuela Vunivalu. His last test 
His last international cap was against England, at Suva, on 16 June 1988.

Notes

External links
 

Fiji international rugby union players
Fijian rugby union players
Rugby union number eights
1957 births
Sportspeople from Nadi
Living people
I-Taukei Fijian people